Charles Stephen Millington (March 13, 1855 – October 25, 1913) was a U.S. Representative from New York.

Born in Norway, New York, Millington attended the district schools of Poland, the Fairfield Academy, and Hungerford Collegiate Institute. He entered the employ of the Hungerford National Bank, Adams, New York, and became the cashier of the Bank of Poland.

Millington moved to Herkimer, New York, in 1894 and continued in the banking business. He served as delegate to the 1908 Republican National Convention.

Millington was elected as a Republican to the Sixty-first Congress (March 4, 1909 – March 3, 1911). He was an unsuccessful candidate for reelection in 1910 to the Sixty-second Congress.

Millington was appointed by President Taft as Assistant Treasurer of the United States in charge of the subtreasury in New York City on May 12, 1911, and served until his death in Herkimer on October 25, 1913.

He was interred in Pine Grove Cemetery in Poland, New York.

Sources

1855 births
1913 deaths
Republican Party members of the United States House of Representatives from New York (state)
19th-century American politicians